Alfred H. Piquenard (1826-1876) was an American architect. Born in France, he studied at Paris' Ecole Centrale des Arts et Manufactures before emigrating to the United States as part of the Icarian movement. After leaving the Icarians, he began work as an architect.  He apprenticed with George I. Barnett in St. Louis and then later partnered  with John C. Cochrane in Chicago to design the Illinois State Capitol and Iowa State Capitol.

References

External links

Baxter-Snyder Center for Icarian Studies at Western Illinois University

French emigrants to the United States
1826 births
1876 deaths
19th-century American architects